Rizvand-e Najaf (also Romanized as Rīzvand-e Najaf; also known as Rezawand, Ridhwān, Rīzavand, Rīzehvand, Rīzehvand-e Najaf, and Rīzvand-e Bālā) is a village in Beshiva Pataq Rural District, in the Central District of Sarpol-e Zahab County, Kermanshah Province, Iran. At the 2006 census, its population was 273, in 64 families.

References 

Populated places in Sarpol-e Zahab County